Corinth National Cemetery is a United States National Cemetery in the city of Corinth, in Alcorn County, Mississippi. Administered by the United States Department of Veterans Affairs, it encompasses , and as of the end of 2005, had 7,137 interments. It is managed by the Little Rock National Cemetery.

History 
Corinth National Cemetery was established in 1866 as a place to inter the Union casualties of the Second Battle of Corinth, and other battles in the region. By the late 1870s there were over 5,000 interments in the cemetery, nearly 4,000 of which were of unknown dead.

Corinth National Cemetery was added to the National Register of Historic Places in 1996.

Along with other sites, it was included in Siege and Battle of Corinth Sites, a National Historic Landmark designated in 1991

References

External links 
 Corinth National Cemetery at the National Cemetery Administration
 
 

American Civil War cemeteries
Protected areas of Alcorn County, Mississippi
Cemeteries on the National Register of Historic Places in Mississippi
United States national cemeteries
National Register of Historic Places in Alcorn County, Mississippi
Corinth, Mississippi